Amica is a Poland-based international company. It is a global manufacturer of household appliances headquartered in Wronki, in the western-central Poland. The company produces refrigerators, washing machines and dishwashers, vacuum cleaners, microwave ovens, electric stoves, kettles for the kitchen under the brands Hansa, CDA, Gram.

History 
Amica was founded in 1945 under the names Predom-Wromet Heating Equipment Factory and Wromet Kitchen Products Factory.

In the 1980s, products were exported to the GDR. In 1992, the company was privatized and renamed Amica. In the same year, Amica football club of the same name was created. In 1997 it was listed on the Warsaw Stock Exchange.

In 2001, Amica acquired the Danish rival Gram Domestic, and the following year the German Premiere Hausgeräteetechnik GmbH.

The main sales market for Amica is in Poland, Germany, Great Britain and Scandinavia. The Amica Group brand portfolio also includes foreign brands: Gram, Hansa and CDA. Gram is a Danish brand that has existed since 1901, acquired by Amica in 2001 and known in Scandinavia. Hansa is a brand that can be found in the markets of Eastern Europe. CDA is a UK brand acquired in 2015 and recognized in distribution channels such as kitchen furniture studios. In 2017, Amica bought a 60.71% stake in Sideme SA Societe Industrielle d'Equipement Moderne, one of the distributors of home appliances in France. After purchasing 39.29% of the shares in August 2015, Amica already owns 100% of Sideme. The total purchase price of all shares of the French company was 5.4 million Euros, which were financed from own funds.

In 2010, Samsung Electronics bought two Amica factories in the Polish cities Poznan and Wronki for the production of refrigerators and washing machines.

References

Electronics companies established in 1945
Home appliance manufacturers
Home appliance brands
Companies listed on the Warsaw Stock Exchange
Manufacturing companies of Poland
Multinational companies headquartered in Poland
Polish brands
Amica Wronki